Northland is the northernmost region of New Zealand. It contains numerous rural primary schools, some small town primary and secondary schools, and a small number of city schools. Area schools in isolated areas provide complete education from primary to secondary level. Intermediate schools exist in Kaitaia, Kaikohe, Dargaville, Whangārei and Kamo.

All schools are coeducational except for Whangarei Boys' and Girls' High Schools in Whangārei. The only private schools are Springbank School in Kerikeri and Otamatea Christian School in Maungaturoto.

Several Kura Kaupapa Māori schools exist in the region, all but one in the Far North District. These schools teach solely or principally in the Māori language. The name "Te Kura Kaupapa Māori o (placename)" can be translated as "The Kaupapa Māori School of (placename)".

In New Zealand schools, students begin formal education in Year 1 at the age of five. Year 13 is the final year of secondary education. Years 14 and 15 refer to adult education facilities.

State schools are those fully funded by the government and at which no fees can be charged, although a donation is commonly requested. A state integrated school is a state school with a special character based on a religious or philosophical belief. A private school, also known as an independent school, charges fees to its students.

The decile indicates the socio-economic group that the school catchment area falls into. A rating of 1 indicates a poor area; a rating of 10 a well-off one. The decile ratings used here come from the Ministry of Education Education Counts website and from the decile change spreadsheet listed in the references. The deciles were last revised using information from the 2013 Census. The roll of each school changes frequently as students start school for the first time, move between schools, and graduate. The rolls given here are those provided by the Ministry of Education, based on figures from November 2012. The Ministry of Education institution number, given in the last column, links to the Education Counts page for each school.

Far North
The Far North District includes the towns of Opononi, Kaikohe and Kawakawa, and the areas north of these towns.

Whangārei
The Whangarei District covers the east and centre of the Northland Region. It includes Ruakākā, Tauraroa, and Titoki, but not Kawakawa.

Kaipara
The Kaipara District is based around the northern reaches of the Kaipara Harbour and includes Dargaville, Ruawai and Maungaturoto.

See also
 Closed schools in the Northland Region

References
General
 
  
 

Specific

Northland